Tattiannaram is a village in Hayathnagar  Rangareddy district in Telangana, India. It falls under Abdullapurmet mandal.

References

Villages in Ranga Reddy district